Abū Ṭalḥa, Zayd ibn Sahl ibn al-Aswad ibn Ḥarām al-Khazrajī was a renowned companion of the Islamic prophet Muḥammad and one of the Anṣār (the ‘Helpers’) of Medina. He was from Banu Khazraj, which after the Hijrah came to be known as the Ansar. He was mostly known as a valiant fighter and skilful archer of the early Islamic period. Abū Ṭalḥa was known to have been a horseman of Muhammad and was at Muhammad's side during the oath of allegiance at al-ʿAqaba and in the battles of Badr, Uḥud and Khandaq.

He died at the age of 70 in the year 34/654 in Medina. Those who narrated from him include: Anas ibn Malik, Ibn Abbas, 'Abd al-Rahman ibn 'Abd al-Qari, 'Abd Allah ibn Abu Talha and Ishaq ibn 'Abd Allah ibn Abi Talha, with the penultimate and last of whom being his son and grandson.

Shuaib Al Arna'ut remarked the feat of Abu Talhah in battlefield which testified by Anas ibn Malik narration, where Abu Talha once managed to kill twenty enemy by his own hand in a single battle during military campaign under Muhammad, and rewarded by the latter to seize each of those twenty enemy soldiers belonging as his spoils of war.

References

Sahabah who participated in the battle of Uhud